The Ogunquit River is a  tidal river in southern Maine. It flows to the Atlantic Ocean at the town of Ogunquit.

Images

See also
List of rivers of Maine

References

Maine Streamflow Data from the USGS
Maine Watershed Data From Environmental Protection Agency

Rivers of York County, Maine
Ogunquit, Maine
Rivers of Maine